Savvas Theodoridis (18 February 1935 – 17 August 2020) was a Greek football player who played as a goalkeeper for Olympiacos and the Greece national team. He was also a member of the Olympic team that participated in the qualification games for the 1960 Summer Olympics, where Greece finished last in their respective group, playing in all four games.

Honours

Olympiacos
Panhellenic Championship: 1954–55, 1955–56, 1956–57, 1957–58, 1958–59
Greek Cup: 1956–57, 1957–58, 1958–59, 1959–60, 1960–61
Piraeus FCA Championship: 1954, 1955, 1957, 1958, 1959

References

1935 births
2020 deaths
Greek footballers
Greece international footballers
Olympiacos F.C. players
Association football goalkeepers
Footballers from Athens